Vanavara Airport  is an airport in Russia located 2 km northeast of Vanavara.  It is a civilian airport with a well-maintained concrete runway and a utilitarian transport layout.  The forest clearway is cleared out to 3 km, suggesting that the runway length may have been longer decades ago.

Airlines and destinations

References

Airports built in the Soviet Union
Airports in Krasnoyarsk Krai
Evenkiysky District